Forum Mall may refer to:

 Forum, a brand of shopping malls in Mexico, including:
 Forum Buenavista, in Buenavista, Cuauhtémoc, Mexico City
 Forum Culiacán, in Culiacán, Sinaloa
 The Forum (shopping mall), a shopping mall in Bangalore, India
 Forum Mall (Kolkata), a shopping mall in Kolkata, India
 Forum Lviv, Ukraine